Cohen & Steers is an American investment management company. It focuses on investments in real estate securities via real estate investment trusts (REIT) and alternative income via preferred securities.

In August 2022, according to a report released by the National Association of Real Estate Investment Trusts, Cohen & Steers was the third largest manager of REIT securities worldwide with $56.6 billion assets under management.

History 

Cohen & Steers was founded in 1986 by Martin Cohen and Robert Steers. Both of them prior to founding the company, worked at the National Securities and Research Corporation where in 1985 they organized and managed the first real estate securities mutual fund in the United States, The National Real Estate Stock Fund.

Cohen & Steers is considered a pioneer in developing the securitised real estate sector and to this day still remains a leader in it. However Cohen & Steers has also been diversifying by expanding its investments into other investments such as preferred securities and real assets starting in 2003 and 2012 respectively.

In August 2004, Cohen & Steers completed its initial public offering to become a listed company on the New York Stock Exchange raising $104.3 million.

In 2016, Cohen retired from day to day management of the company. On November 2021, Steers announced he would be steeping down from his position as CEO and would be succeeded by Joseph Harvey.

In 2021, Cohen & Steers' assets under management figure surpassed $100 billion.

References

External links 
Official website

Companies listed on the New York Stock Exchange
Investment companies based in New York City
Investment companies of the United States
Financial services companies established in 1986
Investment management companies
Companies established in 1986